Jackson Township is one of fourteen townships in Madison County, Indiana, United States. As of the 2010 census, its population was 1,904 and it contained 789 housing units.

The townships name derived from President Andrew Jackson's. name.

Geography

Unincorporated towns
 Hamilton at 
 Perkinsville at 
(This list is based on USGS data and may include former settlements.)

Cemeteries
The township contains these two cemeteries: Neese and Perkinsville.

Landmarks
 Camp Kikthawenund

School districts
 Frankton-Lapel Community Schools

Political districts
 Indiana's 6th congressional district
 State House District 35
 State Senate District 20

References
 
 United States Census Bureau 2008 TIGER/Line Shapefiles
 IndianaMap

External links
 Indiana Township Association
 United Township Association of Indiana
 City-Data.com page for Jackson Township
 Jackson Township History

Townships in Madison County, Indiana
Townships in Indiana